1157 Arabia, provisional designation , is an asteroid from the outer regions of the asteroid belt, approximately 29 kilometers in diameter. It was discovered by astronomer Karl Reinmuth at the Heidelberg Observatory in southwest Germany on 31 August 1929. The asteroid was named for the Arabian Peninsula.

Orbit and classification 

Arabia is a non-family asteroid from the main belt's background population. It orbits the Sun in the outer asteroid belt at a distance of 2.7–3.6 AU once every 5 years and 8 months (2,073 days). Its orbit has an eccentricity of 0.14 and an inclination of 10° with respect to the ecliptic.

The body's observation arc begins at Heidelberg in December 1930, more than a year after its official discovery observation.

Physical characteristics 

Arabia is an assumed carbonaceous C-type asteroid, while the measured albedos are rather typical for a stony composition (see below).

Rotation period 

In June 2008, a rotational lightcurve of Arabia was obtained from photometric observations by Peter Caspari at the 	BDI Observatory near Sydney, Australia. Lightcurve analysis gave a rotation period of 15.225 hours with a brightness amplitude of 0.37 magnitude.

Diameter and albedo 

According to the surveys carried out by the Japanese Akari satellite and the NEOWISE mission of NASA's Wide-field Infrared Survey Explorer, Arabia measures 29.01 and 29.113 kilometers in diameter and its surface has an albedo of 0.211 and 0.247, respectively. The Collaborative Asteroid Lightcurve Link assumes a standard albedo for carbonaceous asteroids of 0.057 and calculates a much larger diameter of 55.67 kilometers based on an absolute magnitude of 10.0.

Naming 

This minor planet was named after the Arabian Peninsula, also known as "Arabia", in Western Asia. The official naming citation was mentioned in The Names of the Minor Planets by Paul Herget in 1955.

Notes

References

External links 
 Asteroid Lightcurve Database (LCDB), query form (info )
 Dictionary of Minor Planet Names, Google books
 Asteroids and comets rotation curves, CdR – Observatoire de Genève, Raoul Behrend
 Discovery Circumstances: Numbered Minor Planets (1)-(5000) – Minor Planet Center
 
 

001157
Discoveries by Karl Wilhelm Reinmuth
Named minor planets
19290831